Abul Barkat (June 16, 1927 – February 21, 1952) was a protester killed during the Bengali Language Movement protests which took place in the erstwhile East Pakistan (currently Bangladesh), in 1952. He is considered a martyr in Bangladesh.

Early life
Barkat was born on June 13 or 16, 1927 in Babla village, Salar that time Bharatpur Block, Murshidabad, West Bengal, British Raj. He studied in Babla primary school and completed his matriculation from Talibpur High School in 1945 and completed his intermediate from Krishnath College in 1947. He moved to Dhaka in 1948 after the Partition of India. He completed his BA in political science from Dhaka University in 1951. He started his MA in political science in Dhaka University.

Bengali Language Movement 
On February 21, 1952, students bought out a protest demanding Bengali language be given the status of national language despite Section 144 (curfew) being imposed. The police fired at the protestors on the road in front of Dhaka Medical College. Barkat was seriously injured and later died at the Dhaka Medical College around 8:00pm on February 21, 1952. He was buried in the Azimpur Graveyard. The location of his grave has since been lost. His mother, Hasina Begum, inaugurated the Shaheed Minar in 1963.

Legacy
Abul Barkat was awarded Ekushey Padak in 2000. A museum has been built for him in Dhaka University campus. A documentary titled Bayanno'r Michhil was made about his life. Movement Hero Abul Barkat memorial museum and archive was open in 2012 in Dhaka University; it was financed by Dhaka District Council.

Gallery

References

External links
 Short biography in Prime Minister's official web site, Govt of Bangladesh

Bengali language movement activists
University of Dhaka alumni
University of Calcutta alumni
Recipients of the Ekushey Padak
1927 births
1952 deaths
Burials at Azimpur Graveyard
Krishnath College alumni